NCAA GameBreaker 99 is a video game developed and published by 989 Studios for the PlayStation in 1998.

Reception

The game received "favorable" reviews according to the review aggregation website GameRankings.

References

External links
 

1998 video games
College football video games
NCAA video games
North America-exclusive video games
PlayStation (console) games
PlayStation (console)-only games
Video games developed in the United States
Video games set in 1999